The Matt Cohen Award is an award given annually by the Writers' Trust of Canada to a Canadian writer, in honour of a distinguished lifetime contribution to Canadian literature. First presented in 2000, it was established in memory of Matt Cohen, a Canadian writer who died in 1999.

Winners
 2000 - Mavis Gallant
 2001 - Norman Levine
 2002 - Fred Bodsworth
 2003 - Audrey Thomas
 2004 - Howard Engel
 2005 - Janet Lunn
 2006 - Marie-Claire Blais
 2007 - David Helwig
 2008 - Sylvia Fraser
 2009 - Paul Quarrington
 2010 - Myrna Kostash
 2011 - David Adams Richards
 2012 - Jean Little
 2013 - Andrew Nikiforuk
 2014 - Susan Musgrave
 2015 - Richard Wagamese
 2016 - Brian Brett
 2017 - Diane Schoemperlen
 2018 - David Bergen
 2019 - Olive Senior
 2020 - Dennis Lee
 2021 - Frances Itani
 2022 - Candace Savage

References

External links
Matt Cohen Award

Writers' Trust of Canada awards
Awards established in 2000
2000 establishments in Canada
Canadian fiction awards